On 14 July 2021, a bus carrying Chinese workers in the Dasu area of Upper Kohistan District, Pakistan, fell into a ravine after an explosion, killing 13 people, including nine Chinese citizens and four Pakistanis, and injured 28 others.

The bombing 
The site of the bombing was near a hydroelectric project where Chinese and Pakistani workers had been working together for several years. The bus fell into a ravine as a result of the attack. The injured were taken by ambulance helicopters to a hospital in Dasu city, 10 km away. Muhammad Hasnain and Muhammed Ayaz, who were identified as Pakistani Taliban members and masterminds of the attack, were arrested and sentenced to death in November 2022.

Background to the assassination 
An editorial in the Global Times, the official newspaper of the Chinese Communist Party, described the bombing as a carefully planned act of terrorism, the worst attack on Chinese citizens in recent years. 

On 12 August 2021, Pakistani Foreign Minister Shah Mahmood Qureshi said that "Afghanistan's soil was used for the terrorist attack and the investigators were "clearly looking at the traces of its planning and executing meeting with the nexus of NDS and RAW revealing "Indian-Afghan nexus" behind this attack".

References

Suicide bombings in Pakistan
21st-century mass murder in Pakistan
Improvised explosive device bombings in Pakistan
Islamic terrorist incidents in 2021
Mass murder in 2021
Massacres in Pakistan
Terrorist incidents in Pakistan in 2021
2021 murders in Pakistan
July 2021 events in Pakistan
Pakistan crime-related lists